Pierre Chevalier (born in Orbec, France on 23 March 1915; died on 10 February 2005) was a French film director and screenwriter. His films included mainstream, erotic and pornographic films. Horror film buffs know him for his 1971 opus Orloff and the Invisible Man (a.k.a. The Invisible Dead).

He also assisted well-known directors in films, notably with Henri Verneuil, René Clément, Jesus Franco and others. Chevalier directed four films with French actress Alice Arno. He served as art director on Jesus Franco's Man Hunter (1980), and filmed some additional footage that was added to the adult film Cecilia (the retitled 1983 re-release version of Jesus Franco's Sexual Aberrations of a Married Woman).

Jesus Franco co-directed Convoy of Women with Chevalier (uncredited) in 1974. The film was re-released in 1978 as East of Berlin.

Filmography

Film director
1955: Les Impures
1956: Vous pigez?
1957: L'Auberge en folie
1957: Fernand clochard
1958: En bordée
1958: Le Sicilien
1959: Soupe au lait
1959: La Marraine de Charley
1960: Le Mouton
1961: Auguste
1962: Peur panique (Règlements de comptes)
1963: Clémentine chérie
1963: Le Bon Roi Dagobert
1968: Nathalie, l'amour s'éveille
1968: Huyendo de sí mismo
1971: Orloff et l'homme invisible / Orloff and the Invisible Man (a.k.a. La Vie amoureuse de l'homme invisible, a.k.a. The Invisible Dead)
1973: Pigalle carrefour des illusions
1973: Avortement clandestin!
1974: Des hommes de joie (or Hommes de joie pour femmes vicieuses) a.k.a. Men for Sale, a.k.a. Ladies House of Pleasure
1974: Convoi de filles / Convoy of Women (re-released in 1978 as East of Berlin)
1974: La Maison des filles perdues / The House of Lost Women
1976: Vergewaltigt
1978: Viol, la grande peur
1980: La Pension des surdoués
1981: La Maison Tellier
1983: Cecilia (this re-release version of Jesus Franco's Sexual Aberrations of a Married Woman contained additional footage shot by Chevalier)
1984: Panther Squad
1984: Foutez-moi par tous les trous

Assistant film director
Chevalier assisted in the making of the following films:

Screenwriter
1955: Les Impures
1959: La Marraine de Charley
1960: Le Mouton
1961: Auguste
1971: Orloff et l'homme invisible (a.k.a. La Vie amoureuse de l'homme invisible)
1974: La Maison des filles perdues

References

External links

French film directors
French pornographic film directors
French male screenwriters
20th-century French screenwriters
1915 births
2005 deaths
20th-century French male writers